Stephen Richard Tully (born 10 February 1980) is an English footballer, who is last player-manager at Truro City. He was born in Paignton, Devon.

He began his career as a fullback with his local side Torquay United, turning professional in August 1997 and making his league debut in a 0–0 draw away to Barnet on 18 November that year. He went on to make over 160 appearances for the Gulls before being released at the end of the 2001–02 season.

He joined non-league side Weymouth in August 2002, quickly establishing himself in the side and winning the awards for Player of the Year and Away Player of the Season in 2003–2004. He lost his place in the side after the appointment of Steve Johnson as manager and asked for a transfer in January 2005.

Although he later withdrew this request, he was allowed to join Exeter City in February 2005. However, he returned to Weymouth in May that year as new manager Garry Hill's first summer signing on a two-year deal. He returned to Exeter in January 2007 and was a regular in the side that made the play-off final at the end of that season, scoring the winning penalty in the semi-final against Oxford United. On 2 July 2013 Tully was released by Exeter City.

After leaving Exeter, Tully briefly joined Tiverton Town before joining Truro City on 19 October 2013. He scored his first goal for Truro from the penalty spot in the 3–2 win at Hitchin Town on 2 November. He was appointed player-manager on 13 March 2014, at least until the end of the 2013–14 season, after the sacking of Steve Massey.

References

External links

1980 births
Living people
People from Paignton
English footballers
Torquay United F.C. players
Weymouth F.C. players
Exeter City F.C. players
Tiverton Town F.C. players
Truro City F.C. players
English football managers
Truro City F.C. managers
Southern Football League managers
Association football fullbacks